The Moose Jaw Miller Express are a collegiate summer baseball team based in Moose Jaw, Saskatchewan, Canada. They play in the Western Canadian Baseball League.

Baseball teams in Saskatchewan
Sport in Moose Jaw